Begonia listada, the striped begonia, is a species of flowering plant in the family Begoniaceae, native to Brazil. It produces small pink-tinted white flowers intermittently throughout the year. As it does not tolerate temperatures below , in temperate regions it must be grown under glass.

This plant has gained the Royal Horticultural Society's Award of Garden Merit.

References

Flora of Brazil
listada